Eskil Adolf Falk (4 February 1889 – 24 March 1963) was a Swedish track and field athlete who competed in the 1912 Summer Olympics. In 1912 he participated in the javelin throw competition, but all three of his attempts were invalid.

References

External links
Eskil Falk's profile at the Swedish Olympic Committee 

1889 births
1963 deaths
Swedish male javelin throwers
Olympic athletes of Sweden
Athletes (track and field) at the 1912 Summer Olympics